The 1st government of Turkey (30 October 1923 – 6 March 1924) was the first government formed in the Republic of Turkey. In reality, there were other governments between 23 April 1920 and 29 October 1923, but the republic was proclaimed on 29 October 1923, and the governments were numbered only after this date.

Background 
The first prime minister was İsmet İnönü of the Republican People's Party (CHP, than known as People’s Party). Although İnönü was a successful general during the Turkish War of Independence, he had also proved himself an able politician during the talks of Armistice of Mudanya and the Treaty of Lausanne.

The government
In the list below, the cabinet members who served only a part of the cabinet's lifespan are shown in the column "Notes".

In 1923–1924, surnames were not in use in Turkey, which would remain true until the Surname Law. The surnames given in the list are the surnames the members of the cabinet assumed later.

Aftermath
Ministry of Shariah was taken over from the Ottoman Empire, and the Ministry of General Staff was a temporary ministry which was active during the war of independence. Both ministries were abolished on 3 March 1924, and İsmet İnönü resigned to form a new government.

References

Republican People's Party (Turkey) politicians
01
1923 establishments in Turkey
1924 disestablishments in Turkey
Cabinets established in 1923
Cabinets disestablished in 1924
Members of the 1st government of Turkey
2nd parliament of Turkey
Republican People's Party (Turkey)